The 2007 Volta a Lleida (55th edition) road cycling race took place from June 4 to June 9, 2007, in Lleida, Catalonia, Spain. Francis De Greef took overall victory, becoming second rider of Belgium to win general classification.

Stages

Stage 1 – June 4, 2007: Lleida > Alcarràs, 120.4 km

Stage 2 – June 5, 2007: Alcarràs > Tremp, 114.3 km

Stage 3 – June 6, 2007: Tremp > La Seu d'Urgell, 85.4 km

Stage 4 – June 7, 2007: La Seu d'Urgell > Vielha, 127.3 km

Stage 5 – June 8, 2007: Vielha > Les, 20.0km (TTT)

Stage 5 (second area) – June 8, 2007: Les > El Pont de Suert, 60.0 km

Stage 6 – June 9, 2007: El Pont de Suert > Lleida, 140.7 km

External links
   

Volta a Lleida
Lleida
Lleida